Love Is Fire may refer to:

"Love Is Fire", a single by The Parachute Club
"Love Is Fire", a song by Freya Ridings from her 2019 self-titled album